William Stanton may refer to:

Entertainment
 William Graham Stanton (1917–1999), British radio playwright
 Will Stanton (actor) (1885–1969), American actor
 Will Stanton (author) (1918–1996), author of humorous fiction and articles
 Will Stanton, fictional character from The Dark Is Rising series
 William Stanton, fictional character from By Force of Arms

Politics
 William Henry Stanton (MP) (1790–1870), British Member of Parliament for Stroud
 William Henry Stanton (congressman) (1843–1900), United States Congressman from Pennsylvania
 J. William Stanton (1924–2002), United States Congressman from Ohio
 William F. Stanton, served in California legislature
 William Stanton (diplomat) (born 1947), United States diplomat

Other
 William Stanton (mason) (1639–1705), English mason and sculptor
 William A. Stanton, better known as Buck Stanton (1870–1909), entomologist at Manila Observatory
 Bill Stanton (footballer) (1890–1977), English footballer
 Bill Stanton (Canadian football) (1924–2010), Canadian football player, Ottawa Rough Riders
 William Stanton (historian) a.k.a. William Ragan Stanton (ca. 1925–2007), professor of history at the University of Pittsburgh